Marqués de los Jardines de Aranjuez is a hereditary title in the Spanish nobility. This marquisate was bestowed by King Juan Carlos on the composer Joaquín Rodrigo on 30 December 1991. His music counts among some of the most popular of the 20th century. Rodrigo's title recalls his Concierto de Aranjuez, which is considered one of the pinnacles of the Spanish music. It was inspired by the gardens at Palacio Real de Aranjuez, the spring resort palace and gardens built by King Philip II in the last half of the 16th century. The work attempts to transport the listener to another place and time through the evocation of the sounds of nature.

The current holder of the title is Joaquín Rodrigo's daughter Cecilia. The heir apparent is her elder daughter, Cecilita León Rodrigo.

List of Marquesses
 Joaquín Rodrigo Vidre, 1st Marquess de los Jardines de Aranjuez (1901–1999)
 Cecilia Rodrigo Kamhi, 2nd Marchioness de los Jardines de Aranjuez (born 1941)

References

Marquessates in the Spanish nobility
Noble titles created in 1991
Aranjuez